Chisocheton koordersii is a tree in the family Meliaceae. It is named for the Dutch botanist Sijfert Hendrik Koorders.

Description
The bark is brown. The flowers are white.

Distribution and habitat
Chisocheton koordersii is found in Borneo and Sulawesi.

References

koordersii
Trees of Borneo
Trees of Sulawesi
Plants described in 1979